Nevado del Plomo, also spelled as Nevado El Plomo, is a mountain on the border between Argentina and Chile. Juncal Sur Glacier, which feeds the Olivares River, descends the west side of the mountain. Nevado del Plomo is part of the Central Andes and has an elevation of  metres. The Argentine portion is within the protection area of Tupungato Volcano Provincial Park. It is on the border of two provinces: Argentinean province of Mendoza and Chilean province of Cordillera. Its slopes are within the administrative boundaries of two cities: Argentinean city of Luján de Cuyo and Chilean commune of San José de Maipo.

First Ascent 
Nevado del Plomo was first climbed by Friedrich Reichert, Friedrich Bade, Robert Helbling (Germany) in 01/20/1910.

Elevation 
It has an official height of 6070 meters. Other data from available digital elevation models: SRTM 6062 metres, ASTER 6037 metres, TanDEM-X 5303 metres. The height of the nearest key col is 4833 meters, leading to a topographic prominence of 1500 meters. Nevado del Plomo is considered a Mountain Subrange according to the Dominance System  and its dominance is 20.38%. Its parent peak is Tupungato and the Topographic isolation is 39.5 kilometers.

References

Andeshandbook: Nevado del Plomo

Mountains of Mendoza Province
Mountains of Santiago Metropolitan Region
Argentina–Chile border
International mountains of South America
Six-thousanders of the Andes
Principal Cordillera